Mbed is a platform and operating system for internet-connected devices based on 32-bit ARM Cortex-M microcontrollers. Such devices are also known as Internet of Things devices. The project is collaboratively developed by Arm and its technology partners.

Software development

Applications 
The primary way of developing Mbed applications is with the Arm Online Ide "Keil Studio Cloud" which is an online ide that uses cloud services to build and compile mbed applications.
Applications can be developed also with other development environments such as Keil µVision, IAR Embedded Workbench, and Eclipse with GCC ARM Embedded tools.

Mbed OS 
Mbed OS provides the Mbed C/C++ software platform and tools for creating microcontroller firmware that runs on IoT devices. It consists of the core libraries that provide the microcontroller peripheral drivers, networking, RTOS and runtime environment, build tools and test and debug scripts. These connections can be secured by compatible SSL/TLS libraries such as Mbed TLS or wolfSSL, which supports mbed-rtos.

A components database provides driver libraries for components and services that can be connected to the microcontrollers to build a final product.

Mbed OS, the RTOS, is based on Keil RTX5.

Hardware development

Demo-boards 

There are various hardware demo-boards for the Mbed platform, with the first being the original Mbed Microcontroller board. The Mbed Microcontroller Board (marketed as the "mbed NXP LPC1768") is a demo-board based on an NXP microcontroller, which has an ARM Cortex M3 core, running at 96 MHz, with 512 KB flash, 32 KB RAM, as well as several interfaces including Ethernet, USB Device, CAN, SPI, I2C and other I/O. The Mbed microcontroller received first prize in the annual EDN Innovation Awards' Software/Embedded Tools category in 2010.

Various versions of the board were released, with NXP LPC2368 (ARM7TDMI-S), NXP LPC1768 (Cortex-M3), NXP LPC11U24 (Cortex-M0) microcontrollers.

HDK 
The Mbed hardware development kit (HDK) is designed for OEMs, and provides information to build custom hardware to support Mbed OS. This consists of interface firmware and schematics that can be used to easily create development boards, OEM modules and re-programmable products suitable for production.

Project development 
The project is developed by Arm in conjunction with other major technology companies and the Mbed developer community. Development and contributions happen at different levels:
 Core Platform – The core software platform, developed by core contributors and partner companies and managed and maintained by the Mbed team. This core platform is developed under the Apache License 2.0 via a contributor agreement. This includes all the core generic software components the platform provides, plus the HAL ports that allow Mbed to transparently run on different manufacturers microcontrollers and the toolchain ports that allow development using different embedded toolchains.
 Component Database – Library components, developed by companies and the wider community, to provide support for peripheral components, sensors, radios, protocols and cloud service apis needed to build end devices. These are contributed under the Apache License 2.0 (encouraged) or other licenses chosen by the creators, and supported by those individual companies and members of the developer community

Historical tools 
Applications for the Mbed platform could be developed using the Mbed online IDE, a free online code editor and compiler. Only a web browser needed to be  installed on the local PC, since a project was compiled on the cloud, i.e. on a remote server, using the ARMCC C/C++ compiler. The Mbed IDE provided private workspaces with ability to import, export, and share code with distributed Mercurial version control, and it could be used also for code documentation generation. It was shut down 03/01/2023.

References

External links 
 
 

ARM operating systems
Microcontroller software